Yvonne Brandtrup Knudsen-Hansen (born 7 August 1964) is a Danish sprint canoeist who competed from the late 1980s to the early 1990s. She won two medals in the K-1 500 m at the ICF Canoe Sprint World Championships with a silver in 1990 and a bronze 1986.

Knudsen also competed in two Summer Olympics, earning her best finish of fifth in the K-1 500 m event at Seoul in 1988.

Her sister, Jeanette, also competed as a sprint canoer for Denmark in the Summer Olympics.

References

Sports-Reference.com

1964 births
Canoeists at the 1988 Summer Olympics
Canoeists at the 1992 Summer Olympics
Danish female canoeists
Living people
Olympic canoeists of Denmark
ICF Canoe Sprint World Championships medalists in kayak